The Polytechnic Institute of Bordeaux (Bordeaux INP) (Institut polytechnique de Bordeaux, Groupe Bordeaux INP and before INPB) is a French technological university system consisting of six engineering schools.

The institute is a Grand établissement.

Bordeaux INP offers through its internal schools nine engineering specialties, in:

 Agrifood and Biological Engineering
 Biotechnology
 Chemistry and Engineering Physics
 Cognitive
 Electronics
 Georesources and Environment
 Computer science
 Mathematics and Mechanics
 Industrial Performance and Aeronautical Maintenance
 Telecommunications.

The institute also offers Masters of Science in: Radio and telecommunications systems, Nano and Micro technologies, Design and processing of inorganic materials, and in Applied Formulation of Polymers and Colloids.

Notable Teacher 
 Rémi Abgrall, a French applied mathematician

Notes

References

External links
 Bordeaux INP official site

Engineering universities and colleges in France
Research institutes in France
Technical universities and colleges in France
Universities and colleges in Bordeaux
Grandes écoles
2009 establishments in France